My Turn may refer to:

Books
My Turn (memoir), a 1989 autobiography by Nancy Reagan
My Turn: Hillary Clinton Targets the Presidency, a 2015 biography by Doug Henwood

Music

Albums
My Turn (Doug Stone album), 2007
My Turn (Lil Baby album), 2020
My Turn (Tanya Tucker album), 2009
My Turn (EP) or the title song (see below), by John Lundvik, 2019

Songs
"My Turn" (Hoobastank song), 2009
"My Turn" (John Lundvik song), 2018
"My Turn" (Martina Bárta song), 2017
"My Turn", by Basement Jaxx from Scars, 2009
"My Turn", by Luke and Q, 2006